Ryan Douglas Nelson (born June 23, 1973) is a United States circuit judge of the United States Court of Appeals for the Ninth Circuit. He was previously nominated to become Solicitor of the United States Department of the Interior, but was never confirmed.

Early life and education 

Nelson earned a Bachelor of Arts in English literature from Brigham Young University (BYU) in 1996. He then attended BYU's J. Reuben Clark Law School, where he was lead articles editor of the BYU Law Review. During law school, he was a law clerk for then-Senate Legal Counsel, Thomas B. Griffith, during the impeachment trial of President Bill Clinton,  and assisted with preparation for Clinton's impeachment trial. He graduated in 1999 with a Juris Doctor with honors and Order of the Coif membership.

Legal career
After law school, Nelson clerked for Judge Karen LeCraft Henderson of the United States Court of Appeals for the District of Columbia Circuit and for Richard M. Mosk and Charles N. Brower of the Iran–United States Claims Tribunal in The Hague, Netherlands. Nelson worked as an associate at Sidley Austin. He argued 13 federal court of appeals cases on environmental and constitutional issues before becoming a judge.

Nelson previously served as a Deputy Assistant Attorney General in the Environment and Natural Resources Division of the United States Department of Justice and as Deputy General Counsel for the Office of Management and Budget. He also served as special counsel for the United States Senate Committee on the Judiciary and as a law clerk for the Senate Legal Counsel.

From 2009 to 2018, Nelson was General Counsel of Melaleuca, Inc. In July 2017, he was nominated to be Solicitor of the United States Department of the Interior. In September 2017, Nelson appeared before the Committee on Energy and Natural Resources. His nomination was then placed on the Senate Executive Calendar, but it was never confirmed by the full Senate.

Federal judicial service 

On May 10, 2018, President Donald Trump withdrew Nelson's nomination to be Solicitor of the Department of the Interior and announced his intent to instead nominate him to serve as a United States circuit judge of the United States Court of Appeals for the Ninth Circuit. On May 15, 2018, his nomination was sent to the Senate. Nelson was nominated to the seat vacated by Judge N. Randy Smith, who assumed senior status on August 11, 2018. On July 11, 2018, a hearing on his nomination was held before the Senate Judiciary Committee.  On September 13, 2018, his nomination was reported out of committee by an 11–10 vote. On October 11, 2018, his nomination was confirmed by a 51–44 vote. He received his judicial commission on October 18, 2018.

Memberships 

Nelson has been a member of the Federalist Society since 1997. He has served as a council member and co-chair of the General Counsel Committee for the American Bar Association Administrative Law and Regulatory Practice since 2012. Nelson has been a member of the Idaho Chapter of the Federal Bar Association and the Eagle Rock Inns of Court since 2010. He was a member of the Republican National Lawyers Association from 2005 until 2018.

Personal life 
Nelson was born and raised in Idaho Falls, Idaho. Nelson is married to Barbara Baer and they have seven children.

References

External links 
 
 

1973 births
Living people
20th-century American lawyers
21st-century American lawyers
21st-century American judges
American Mormon missionaries in Belgium
Brigham Young University alumni
Federalist Society members
George W. Bush administration personnel
Idaho lawyers
J. Reuben Clark Law School alumni
Judges of the United States Court of Appeals for the Ninth Circuit
People from Idaho Falls, Idaho
United States court of appeals judges appointed by Donald Trump
United States Department of Justice lawyers
United States Office of Management and Budget officials
United States Senate lawyers